Mineral City is an unincorporated community in Richland Township, Greene County, Indiana.

History
A post office was established at Mineral City in 1877, and remained in operation until it was discontinued in 1950. The post office was called Mineral in its final years.

Geography

References

Unincorporated communities in Greene County, Indiana
Unincorporated communities in Indiana
Bloomington metropolitan area, Indiana